Glendale Historic District may refer to:

 Glendale Historic District (Glendale, Ohio), listed on the NRHP in Ohio
 Glendale Historic District (Glendale, Kentucky), listed on the NRHP in Hardin County, Kentucky